Guardia, guardia scelta, brigadiere e maresciallo is a 1956 Italian comedy film directed by Mauro Bolognini.

Cast  
Aldo Fabrizi: Brigadiere Pietro Spaziani 
Alberto Sordi: Alberto Randolfi 
Peppino De Filippo:  Giuseppe Manganiello 
Gino Cervi: Maresciallo
Nino Manfredi: Paolo
Valeria Moriconi: Maria
Tiberio Mitri: Sandro
Edoardo Nevola: Tonino
Alessandra Panaro: Charlotte
Lydia Johnson: Beba
Memmo Carotenuto: Ugo
Oscar Blando: Nino
Mino Doro: Giacomo
Riccardo Garrone: Enrico
Anita Durante: Adriana
Mario Brega :  Strinati's sparring-partner boxer

References

External links

1956 comedy films
1956 films
Italian comedy films
Films directed by Mauro Bolognini
Films set in Rome
Films shot in Rome
1950s Italian films
1950s Italian-language films
Italian black-and-white films